Mallomonas sorohexareticulata is a species of heterokont algae. It is a tiny free-living cell, about the width of a human hair. It has ornate scales and bristles, as well as long spines. It is a relatively common part of lake or pond plankton. It differs from its cogenerates by the number, distribution, and size of its base plate pores, the secondary structures on the scale surfaces, together with characteristics of its bristles.

References

Further reading
Gusev, E. S. "A New Species in Genus Mallomonas Perty (Synurales, Chrysophyceae) from Vietnam." International Journal on Algae 17.4 (2015).
Гусев, Е. С. "Новый вид рода Mallomonas Perty (Synurales, Chrysophyceae) из водоёмов Вьетнама." Альгология 25,№ 4 (2015): 428-438.

External links
 AlgaeBase

Protists described in 2013
Ochrophyta